Erik Jörgen Carl Ullenhag (born 20 July 1972, in Uppsala) is a Swedish politician who served as Minister for Integration from October 2010 to  October 2014 and as parliamentary group leader of the Liberal People's Party in the Swedish Riksdag from October 2014 to June 2016. He took office as Ambassador of Sweden to Jordan on 1 September 2016.

He previously served as Minister for Integration in the Swedish Government from 2010 to 2014. A member of the Liberal People's Party, now the Liberals, he was a member of parliament for Uppsala County from 2002 to 2006, from 2009 to 2010 and again from 2014. He is also second vice chairman of the Liberal People's Party since 2010.

Ullenhag was chairman for the Liberal Youth of Sweden between 1997 and 1999 and a member of the Riksdag between 2002 and 2006, and again from 2009 to 2010. He was party secretary for the Liberal People's Party between 2006 and 2010.

Erik Ullenhag is the son of Jörgen Ullenhag.

References

External links
 Erik Ullenhag at the  Liberal People's Party website 
 Erik Ullenhag at the Riksdag website 

1972 births
21st-century Swedish politicians
Ambassadors of Sweden to Jordan
Living people
Members of the Riksdag 2002–2006
Members of the Riksdag 2006–2010
Members of the Riksdag 2010–2014
Members of the Riksdag 2014–2018
Members of the Riksdag from the Liberals (Sweden)
People from Uppsala
Swedish Ministers for Integration